Arturo Fortunato Alessandri Palma (December 20, 1868 – August 24, 1950) was a Chilean political figure and reformer who served thrice as president of Chile, first from 1920 to 1924, then from March to October 1925, and finally from 1932 to 1938.

Early life

Arturo Alessandri was the son of Pedro Alessandri Vargas and Susana Palma Guzmán. His grandfather, Pietro Allesandri Tarzi, was an Italian immigrant from Tuscany who had arrived in Chile from Argentina. Alessandri’s father, Pedro, became head of the family at the age of 19; at the time of Alessandri’s birth, he ran an estate in Longaví. At the age of 12, Alessandri enrolled at the Sacred Hearts High School, where his brothers and father had studied.

At the age of 20, Alessandri began his legal studies at the University of Chile. In 1891, while studying, he participated in the newspaper La Justicia, which was opposed to then President José Manuel Balmaceda. After graduating in 1893, Alessandri married Rosa Ester Rodríguez Velasco, with whom he had 9 children.

In 1897, Alessandri began his political career, becoming a member of the Liberal Party and representative of Curicó, a seat he would keep for nearly 20 years. In 1915, already aspiring to the presidency, Alessandri challenged the senator of Tarapacá Province, Arturo del Río; he won a hard-fought victory, from where he earned the nickname of “León de Tarapacá” (“Lion of Tarapacá”).

In 1920, Alessandri was the Liberal Alliance candidate for president, narrowly defeating his opponent of the Coalition Party, Luis Barros Borgoño. With speeches favoring the working class, Alessandri alarmed Chilean conservatives, who felt their interests were in jeopardy. Since the opposition controlled the National Congress, Alessandri favored strengthening the executive power, which lacked political weight before the Congress (Parliamentary Era).

First administration
During most of 1924, Chile had been politically paralyzed by a conflict between the President and the conservatively controlled Congress, who refused to enact the laws that he submitted. On September 3, 1924, a group of 56 military officers protested for their low salaries, in the incident known as the  ruido de sables (or "saber-rattling"). The next day the same group of young military officers led by Colonel Marmaduque Grove and Major Carlos Ibáñez del Campo, created the "military committee" to defend themselves from the government. On September 5, the "military committee" demanded of President Alessandri the dismissal of three of his ministers, including the Minister of War; the enactment of a labor code, the passage of an income tax law, and the improvement of the military salaries. Alessandri had no option but to appoint General Luis Altamirano, the Army Inspector General, as head of a new cabinet. On September 8, General Altamirano appeared in front of Congress to demand the passage of eight laws, including Alessandri's labor code. Congress didn't dare to protest, and the laws were passed in a matter of hours.

At that point, Alessandri felt that he had become just a pawn of the military and on September 9, he resigned, and requested asylum at the US Embassy. Congress refused to accept his resignation, and instead granted him a six-month constitutional leave of absence. He left the country immediately for Italy. On September 11, a military Junta — the September Junta — was established to rule the country in his absence.

Second administration

The September Junta was not homogeneous, and quickly a progressive wing, headed by Marmaduke Grove and Carlos Ibáñez del Campo, developed contacts with the Comité Obrero Nacional and others labour organizations who advocated for Alessandri's return. This led to a coup in January 1925, directed by Colonel Grove who handed out the power to General Pedro Dartnell as interim president while waiting for Alessandri's return. Dartnell formed the January Junta, before retroceding the power to Alessandri on March 20, 1925. Alessandri had a new Constitution drafted, and approved by plebiscite by 134,421 voters on August 30. The Constitution, which was promulgated on September 18, 1925, reinforced presidential powers over the legislative. Furthermore, Alessandri created a Central Bank, initiating the first rupture with laissez faire policies

His second government began with the support of left-wing and radical groups. However, this second group began to distance itself from the President. In March 1925, Alessandri's government repressed a demonstration, leading to the Marusia massacre, soon followed by La Coruña massacre. This break with the working classes caused him to try to maintain a right-wing-radical alliance until 1937, when it took a turn towards the left.  In order to face the threats of a coup, Alessandri relied on the republican forces, entrusted with repressing any intent to revolt and never to get involved in politics. They were created shortly before Alessandri's return, as a consequence of the civil movement.  They functioned in secret and then publicly, marching in a great parade May 7, 1933, in front of the President, who saluted them. They auto-disbanded in 1936, having considered their mission complete. The President asked the Parliament on several opportunities for the state of constitutional exception, resulting in illegal actions, such as the famous burning of the Topaze Magazine issue No. 285, which depicted a caricature of Alessandri he considered offensive.

That time was also marked by the appearance of new violent occurrences, such as the rural rebellion of Ránquil and their bloody repression, and the Nazi-inspired National Socialist Movement of Chile of Jorge González von Marées. In the economic sphere, the recovery of the crisis of 1929 was begun with the work of the Treasury Minister Gustavo Ross, a pragmatic liberal who implemented a "towards in" approach to growth. With respect to nitrates, he dissolved COSACH and created the COVENSA (Corporation of Nitrate and Iodine Sale), a multi-faceted distributor and not a producer. He balanced the fiscal deficit with new taxes and resumed payment of the external debt, with losses for holders of Chilean bonds. When they reached a surplus, they focused on public works.  The construction of the National Stadium in Santiago, inaugurated in December 1938, stands out.

The degree of Alessandri's responsibility in the 1938 Seguro Obrero massacre has been a subject of speculation.

Public life after the presidency

His political life did not end with his presidency. Due to the death of the communist Senator of Curico, Talca, Linares and Maule, Amador Pairoa, he participated in a complementary Senatorial election and won, returning to the Senate on November 8. In 1949 he was reelected but this time for Santiago, while also chosen to be President of this body.

He was of vital importance in the presidential elections of 1942 and 1946, in the first by causing a division of votes of the liberals, supporting Juan Antonio Ríos, and in the second by presenting himself as a preliminary candidate of the liberals.  He later yielded his candidacy to his son Fernando, resulting in the division of the presidential candidates of the right and conservative support for Dr. Eduardo Cruz-Coke, in turn favoring the victory of Gabriel González Videla. While President of the Senate of Chile, Alessandri died at the age of 82, on August 24, 1950, and was replaced by his son Fernando Alessandri. One of his other sons, Jorge Alessandri, was president of Chile from 1958 to 1964.

Honours and awards

Foreign Honours 
:
  Grand Cross with Diamonds of the Order of the Dannebrog (4 October 1937)
:
  Grand Cross of the Order of the Tower and Sword (6 July 1925)
:
  Grand Cross of the Order of Naval Merit (1912)

See also
Alessandri family
San Gregorio massacre
Marusia massacre
La Coruña massacre
Seguro Obrero massacre

References

External links

San Gregorio Massacre
 

1868 births
1950 deaths
People from Linares Province
Arturo Alessandri
Chilean people of Italian descent
Liberal Party (Chile, 1849) politicians
Presidents of Chile
Chilean Ministers of the Interior
Chilean Ministers of Public Works
Deputies of the XXV Legislative Period of the National Congress of Chile
Deputies of the XXVI Legislative Period of the National Congress of Chile
Deputies of the XXVII Legislative Period of the National Congress of Chile
Deputies of the XXVIII Legislative Period of the National Congress of Chile
Deputies of the XXIX Legislative Period of the National Congress of Chile
Deputies of the XXX Legislative Period of the National Congress of Chile
Presidents of the Senate of Chile
Senators of the XXXI Legislative Period of the National Congress of Chile
Senators of the XXXII Legislative Period of the National Congress of Chile
Senators of the XXXV Legislative Period of the National Congress of Chile
Senators of the XXXVI Legislative Period of the National Congress of Chile
Senators of the XXXIX Legislative Period of the National Congress of Chile
Senators of the XL Legislative Period of the National Congress of Chile
Senators of the XLI Legislative Period of the National Congress of Chile
Candidates for President of Chile
University of Chile alumni
Members of the Chilean Academy of Language
Grand Crosses of the Order of the Dannebrog